Blato is a neighborhood located in the Novi Zagreb - zapad city district of Zagreb, Croatia. It is spread along the Karlovačka Road, south of Jadranska Avenue. The population is 2,553 (2011).

Formerly a village on its own, it has been assimilated into the Zagreb agglomeration during the 20th century. It consists of single family homes and occasional duplex houses.

References

Neighbourhoods of Zagreb
Novi Zagreb